Guatemala competed at the 1988 Summer Olympics in Seoul, South Korea. 28 competitors, 25 men and 3 women, took part in 16 events in 8 sports.

Competitors
The following is the list of number of competitors in the Games.

Athletics

Women's Marathon 
 María del Pilar — 2"51:33 (→ 53rd place)

Boxing

Erick Pérez

Cycling

Five male cyclists represented Guatemala in 1988.

Men's road race
 Andrés Torres
 Óscar Aquino
 Víctor Lechuga

Men's team time trial
 Óscar Aquino
 Julio Illescas
 Víctor Lechuga
 Andrés Torres

Men's 1 km time trial
 Max Leiva

Football

Ricardo Piccinini
Juan Dávila
Rocael Mazariegos
Allan Wellmann
Victor Hugo Monzón
Alejandro Ortiz Obregón
Julio Gómez
David Gardiner
Juan Manuel Funes
Luis Rodolfo López
Carlos Castañeda
Adán Paniagua
Norman Delva
Byron Pérez
Julio Rodas
Jaime Batres
Eddy Alburez
Ottoniel Guevara
Kevin Sandoval

Gymnastics

Maria Inés Flores

Shooting

Carlos René Silva

Swimming

Women's 100 m Butterfly
 Blanca Morales
 Heat – 1:05.02 (→ did not advance, 28th place)

Women's 200 m Butterfly
 Blanca Morales
 Heat – 2:19.28 (→ did not advance, 21st place)

Wrestling

Edwin Vásquez

References

External links
Official Olympic Reports
Guatemala at the Olympic Games

Nations at the 1988 Summer Olympics
1988
Olympics